Service management in the manufacturing context, is integrated into supply chain management as the intersection between the actual sales and the customer point of view. The aim of high-performance service management is to optimize the service-intensive supply chains, which are usually more complex than the typical finished-goods supply chain. Most service-intensive supply chains require larger inventories and tighter integration with field service and third parties. They also must accommodate inconsistent and uncertain demand by establishing more advanced information and product flows. Moreover, all processes must be coordinated across numerous service locations with large numbers of parts and multiple levels in the supply chain.

Among typical manufacturers, post-sale services (maintenance, repair, and parts) account for less than 20% of revenue. But among the most innovative companies in service, those same activities often generate more than 50% of the profits.

Benefits
The main drivers for a company to establish or optimize its service management practices are varied:

 High service costs can be reduced, i.e. by integrating the service and products supply chain.
 Inventory levels of service parts can be reduced and therefore reduce total inventory costs.
 Customer service or parts/service quality can be optimized.
 Increasing service revenue.
 Reduce obsolescence costs of service parts through improved forecasting.
 Improve customer satisfaction levels.
 Reduce expediting costs - with optimized service parts inventory, there is no need to rush orders to customers.
 Minimize technician visits - if they have the right part in hand, they can fix the problem on the first visit.

Components
Generally, service management comprises six different capabilities that companies should consider for optimization:

 Service strategy and service offerings
 Service strategy definition
 Service offerings definition and positioning
 Go-to-market strategy
 Service portfolio management
 Spare parts management
 Parts supply management
 Inventory management
 Parts demand management
 Fulfillment operations and logistics
 Service parts management
 Returns, repairs, and warranties
 Warranty and claims management
 Reverse logistics
 Returns processing
 Remanufacturing
 Field service management or field force effectiveness
 Technician enablement
 Mobility
 E-learning
 Activity scheduling
 Service billing
 Customer management
 Order management and availability
 Channel and partner management
 Customer insight
 Technical documentation
 Assets, maintenance, task scheduling, event management
 Remote monitoring
 Diagnostics and testing
 Asset management/optimization
 Configuration management

See also
 Customer service
 Enterprise architecture
 Managed services
 Service (economics)
 Service economy
 Services marketing
 Service design
 Service provider
 Service science, management and engineering
 Service system
 Strategic service management
 IT service management

Supply chain management